Neuf-Berquin (from ) is a commune in the Nord department in northern France.

French composer and clarinetist Ferdinand Capelle was born in Neuf-Berquin.

Heraldry

See also 
Communes of the Nord department

References 

Neufberquin
French Flanders